Vicente Fox served as President of Mexico from December 1, 2000 to November 30, 2006. His victory in the federal elections in 2000 ended more than 70 years rule of the Institutional Revolutionary Party.

Cabinet 

In contrast with his predecessors, President Fox chose the members of his cabinet through head hunters. At the beginning of his term, Fox dubbed his Cabinet as "el gabinetazo" ("the Super Cabinet"), as a way to recognize the capacity of the Cabinet members. Fox had originally stated that the Cabinet chosen at the beginning of his term would last 6 years, throughout his term, however, this did not happen. Felipe Calderón Hinojosa served as Secretary of Energy for eight months, and resigned under pressure relating to his Presidential ambitions, when competing against Secretary of the Interior, Santiago Creel.

Economy 
Fox was one of the few presidents to avoid a major economic upheaval, although the economy grew at the slowest pace in history, second only to the de la Madrid administration.

Currency and inflation 
Mexico experienced some level of currency devaluation at the end of three of the four presidential terms from 1970 to 1994. Ernesto Zedillo floated the peso at the beginning of his term (1994–2000). Zedillo passed the office to Fox without an economic emergency. In 2006, Vicente Fox, like Zedillo in 2000, left office without a significant devaluation.

According to Banco de México (Mexico's Central Bank), inflation rates during Fox's term went from 11%, in January 2000, at the beginning of his term, to 4.05% in December 2006. During most of Fox's term, inflation was consistently below 6%, mostly around 4.5%. According to the Central Bank, inflation hadn't been that low since before 1973 (the lowest inflation between 1973 and 1999 was above 6%, frequently reaching double and even sometimes triple-digits). Mexico created an estimated 1 million new jobs in 2006, a record.

Growth 
GDP growth dropped from an average of 5.1% in the Zedillo administration to the lowest in a decade, an average of 2.2% during Fox's administration. According to Fox's first government report address (equivalent to the state of the union address in the United States), affected sectors were mining (-1.5% growth), manufacturing (-2.28% growth), and construction (-5.36%), while electricity, gas and water (1.76% growth) and services (2.65%) did not decrease.

Fox's cabinet blamed the low growth on the slowdown of the Economy of the United States, but that country started growing again in 2002-2003. Mexico did not grow at the same pace and was surpassed by China as the second-largest trade partner of the United States. Fox had promised growth of 7% during his campaign and blamed Congress for the low economic growth but his administration had foreseen growth of 3.4% even without the approval of structural reforms, especially fiscal reforms.

Tax revenue as a proportion of GDP fell from 10.6% at the beginning of his administration to 9.7% at the end of his term. In contrast with previous administrations, as a proportion of GDP debt did not grow during Fox's term.

Employment and income 

Minimum wages during Fox's administration increased at a nominal rate of 34% from $35.12 pesos per day in 2000 to $47.05 in  2006. However, Purchasing Power Parity (PPP) terms, real wages decreased 3.8%, from $80.27 to $77.07. According to Banco de México, this compares favorably to previous administrations, for wages had decreased by 75% from $296.22 PPP pesos per day in January 1976, to $73.91 PPP pesos per day in December 1999. Minimum wages had decreased, in real terms, an average of 38% per Presidential administration from 1976 to 2000.

During Fox's term, the number of registered taxpayers grew by 35%. According to data by the Tributary Administration Service, the main driver behind this increase was salaried workers, starting in 2004, which grew by 217% compared to 2000. The more than 12 million salaried workers who are registered to pay tax constitute 56% of the taxpaying base.

Job creation stalled during Fox's first four years. According to the Economist Intelligence Unit not only were no jobs created from 2000-2004 but the number of street vendors increased 40%. This workforce does not pay income or sales tax and significant minority participates in illicit activities such as smuggling and piracy. The latter grew during Fox's term to an 8 billion industry. Net sales of the clothing industry in Mexico is calculated at approximately 1,500 million dollars, of which 910 million are from smuggled clothing.

The number of registered workers affiliated to the Mexican Social Security Institute decreased from 11,026,370 in December 2000 to 10,881,160. Unemployment increased from 2.7% in 2002 to 3.2 in 2003, and the number of non-payroll workers increased to 20 million people or roughly half of the population able to work. Jobs in maquiladoras decreased by 30%

In 2002, Mexico reached a GDP per capita of 9,381 dollars per year and thus became a medium-high income country. Five years later, Mexico upgraded from beneficiary to full contributor to the United Nations Development Program.

Finance and investments 
Housing was among Fox's top priorities. By 2006, the Infonavit, the federal fund for workers' housing, had 60% "market share" in the mortgage business, granting 435,000 credits a year, with an expected yearly growth of 24%.

During Fox's presidency, the Mexican Stock Exchange reached record highs throughout his term. The record highs were caused by a better economic outlook throughout his term, larger foreign currency reserves, and a better debt rating that lowered interest rates.

Mexico suffered a drop in competitiveness during Fox's administration. In 2006, Mexico ranked 56th of 60 countries in the World Competitiveness Yearbook due to poor infrastructure, ease of doing business and high manufacturing costs such as electricity. Fox's large investment in infrastructure did not translate in lower costs, because of a lack of coordination between government bodies. To address this in 2004, Fox launched an Economic Policy for Competitivity ("Política Económica para la Competitividad" or PEC) however, improvement is not expected until after 2013.

Human development 

The Human Development Index (HDI) is a comparative measure of life expectancy, literacy, education, and standard of living for countries worldwide.  The table on the right shows Mexico's Human Development Index (HDI) from 1975 to 2003 along with yearly percentage increases.

HDI improved in the first three years of the Fox administration 0.206% annually, .62% in total, the lowest increase in almost three decades. During the last year of the Zedillo administration Mexico reached, for the first time in history, a HDI of 0.8 which is considered to represent high development. During that period countries such as Canada, France and Great Britain reported low increases and even some decreases while Cuba surpassed Mexico at 0.817, Costa Rica reached 0.838, Argentina scored 0.863 and Brazil increased 1.17%.

Relations with Congress 
In his inaugural speech, Fox said that his Presidency marked a new era of relations between the three political branches. "The President will propose, and the Congress will dispose", he said. This implied that Fox would respect the separation of powers and negotiate with Congress.

The first major controversy occurred during the discussion of comprehensive tax reform that included a value added tax of 15% on all products, including food and medicine, to replace the complex system of discretionary exceptions that still exists today. Congress rejected Fox's proposal.

From then on, relation between the Legislative and the Executive were strained. Lawmakers from opposition parties admitted they had a hard time dealing with Fox, while lawmakers from Fox's party claimed that there were "legislative excesses".

In his final state of the union address in September 2006, leftist lawmakers prevented Fox from speaking. He became the first president to not read his report before Congress and instead gave a televised address to the nation.

Investigations 
Congress opened two investigations but has failed to produce evidence to prosecute the Bribiescas. During one of the investigations Fox called the deputies "delinquents". A third congressional investigation was announced in May 2007.

Foreign policy 

Before Vicente Fox, Mexico practiced the Estrada Doctrine, so named after its creator, Genaro Estrada (Secretary of Foreign Affairs during the Presidency of Pascual Ortiz Rubio). The Estrada Doctrine favored an enclosed view of sovereignty. It claimed that foreign governments should not judge, for good or bad, governments or changes in governments in other nations, because it would imply a breach of their sovereignty.

President Fox appointed Jorge Castañeda to be his Secretary of Foreign Affairs. Castañeda immediately broke with the Estrada Doctrine, promoting what was called by critics the Castañeda Doctrine. The new foreign policy called for an openness and an acceptance of criticism from the international community, and the increase of national involvement in foreign affairs.

During Fox's term, Mexico actively sought (and gained) a temporary seat on the UN Security Council. However, Luis Ernesto Derbez, Secretary of Foreign Affairs after Castañeda, unsuccessfully ran for the position of Secretary General of the Organization of American States, losing to Chilean José Miguel Insulza.

Mexico hosted several international summits during Fox's administration. The Monterrey Summit of 2001 adopted the so-called Monterrey Consensus. President Fox and his Foreign Relations cabinet were protagonists of one of the most serious diplomatic controversies of his administration. At the Summit, many heads of State were invited to the International Conference on Financing for Development. Early in the meeting Cuban President Fidel Castro surprisingly stood and said that he was leaving the city because of "a special situation created by my participation in this Summit". Fox repeatedly denied Castro's subsequent allegations that he was asked to leave the summit, responding to a U.S. request. Several weeks after the incident, a recording of a phone call between Fox and Castro where the Mexican president asks Castro to leave before George Bush arrived at the summit was leaked to the press.

Relations with the United States 

Several media pundits and think tanks like COHA judged the Castañeda Doctrine "overtly submissive" to the United States. COHA's opinion was based on Mexico's support of Guatemala for a seat in the UN Security council, instead of supporting Venezuela, the contending candidate for the seat.

Immigration 
During Fox's administration, Mexico pushed for "comprehensive" reform of U.S. immigration law that addressed the problem of Illegal immigration to the United States. The issue had been called "The Whole Enchilada" by Fox's administration, which stated that "immigration reform in the United States should address mutual border problems, the rights of undocumented immigrants, and the development of regions in Mexico that 'expel' migrants". However, according to former U.S. ambassador to Mexico Jeffrey Davidow, all discussions between the parties on immigration were informal.

The immigration reform that Fox sought included a guest worker plan. Fox said, "The best thing that can happen to both our countries is to have an orderly flow, a controlled flow, of migration to the United States". This reform was supported by President Bush and approved by the U.S. Senate, however, the bill was rejected by the House of Representatives. According to the Washington Post, the hopes were complicated by the recent approval of the SBI (Secure Border Initiative), a bill that includes building a  triple fence between the U.S. and Mexico.

During Fox's presidency the net migration rate in Mexico increased 152% from -2.84 migrants per 1,000 inhabitants to -4.32; in the same period, population growth decreased 35% from 1.57% to 1.16%. Fox, who was said to be "proud" of Mexican immigrants in the U.S. has acknowledged the importance of remittances by both legal and illegal Mexican workers in the U.S. (now the  #1 source of revenue for the country).

Castañeda Doctrine 
Andrés Manuel López Obrador criticized the "Castañeda Doctrine", saying that Mexico should not "get involved in the internal lives of other people, because we do not want other people involved in our internal lives". Indeed, the new foreign policy doctrine openly invited other nations to scrutinize Mexican affairs, criticizing the Estrada Doctrine as offering an excuse to ignore foreign criticism. Finally, José Galán, an editorialist in La Jornada, accused the Fox administration of not doing enough to stop border violence against Mexican nationals.

Iraq War
During the country's tenure as a rotating member of the UN Security Council, Mexico did not support the U.S-led 2003 invasion of Iraq,

Plan Puebla Panama 
Fox promoted a regional development initiative called Plan Puebla Panama, later renamed Proyecto Mesoamérica, which focused on infrastructure, economic development and growth, and market connections between Mexico and seven Central American economies. The pro-business orientation of the plan faced criticism from the Zapatista rebels and some civil society groups in Central America. The plan envisioned US$20 billion over 25 years to create a development corridor, funded in part through matching funds from the private sector and from international financial institutions. Fox's successor Felipe Calderón expressed interest in continuing the plan but gave it no new funding midway through his term in office.

2005 Summit at Mar del Plata 
The Fourth Summit of the Americas took place on November 4 and the 5th in Mar del Plata, Argentina. Fox assisted with the other 33 presidents of countries in the Americas. Fox attempted to restart talks on the Free Trade Area of the Americas (FTAA). However, discussion on the FTAA was not in the agenda of the Summit.

Upon his arrival Hugo Chávez, president of Venezuela, declared:

Fox responded that the FTAA could be created with all of the countries in the Americas with the exception of Venezuela or the countries of the Mercosur.

Marco Aurelio Garcia, one of Brazilian President  Luiz Inácio Lula da Silva's closest advisers, declared that Fox was too hasty in supporting the FTAA. Fox did not applaud after Argentine President Kirchner's presentation, and when Fox attempted to raise the issue of the FTAA, Kirchner retorted that the FTAA was not on the Summit agenda. Fox responded to the press declaring that Kirchner was more concerned with pleasing people in his country than the success of the Summit. Kirchner replied that Fox should attend to the Mexicans because it was the Argentine people who voted for him.

The parliamentary groups of the PAN, PRI, PRD and PVEM in the Senate approved a motion to express their disillusionment about the performance of Fox and Derbez, his Secretary of Foreign Affairs, at the Summit

Education, science, and technology 
According to René Drucker, coordinator of basic science research for National Autonomous University of Mexico (UNAM), "no other government in recent history has neglected research in the basic sciences as Fox's". Fox's plan for the Consejo Nacional de Ciencia y Tecnología, (CONACYT), was that by 2006 this organization would receive 1% of GDP. However the  budget for this organization for 2006 reached only 0.33%. Federal government investment on Research and development in 2004 was 0.41% in Mexico versus 0.95% in Brazil and 0.6% in Chile.

José Vasconcelos Library 
The José Vasconcelos Library, labeled by the press as the "Megabiblioteca" ("megalibrary"), was Fox's largest investment in infrastructure.

Fox inaugurated the library on May 16, 2006 declaring it one of the most advanced constructions of the 21st century, and that it would be spoken of throughout the world. The inauguration took place a week before the deadline the president had to promote his accomplishments before the 2006 Presidential election.

The library had to be closed in March 2007 because of construction  defects. The Superior Auditor of the Federation detected 36 irregularities and issued 13 motions of responsibility for public servants. Among the irregularities was the misplacement of marble blocks. Repairs cost 15 million pesos (roughly 1.4 million dollars).

During the Calderón administration restoration efforts cost another 32 million pesos (roughly 3 million dollars)

Texcoco and San Salvador Atenco 

In 2001, Fox announced the construction of a 2.3 billion dollar international airport in the municipalities of Texcoco and San Salvador Atenco in the State of México to relieve congestion at the overcrowded Mexico City airport, the busiest in Latin America. This new airport would bring thousands of new jobs to an area ravaged by extreme poverty.

The proposed airport plan would relocate 4,375 families and convert  of farmland. Peasants from these areas resisted relocation and formed the Community Front in Defense of Land in 2002. The protests turned violent as protesters took hostages and state forces had to negotiate their release, while Fox announced no change in plans had been considered. After the federal government's failure to negotiate with the farmers, plans for the new airport had to be abandoned. The protesters, many of whom wore black ski masks made famous by rebels in Chiapas became instant heroes to poor farmers nationwide. while journalists, like Sergio Sarmiento called this issue "the biggest failure" of Fox's tenure and declared:

This is in spite of the 1968 Tlatelolco massacre. Jorge Montaño, a former Mexican ambassador to the United States considered Fox was "naive" to think farmers would easily give up their lands and that his government should have taken more time negotiating with the farmers instead of simply sending out engineers to measure runways and calculate flight paths. Montaño also declared that the compensation these farmers were offered were the minimum allowed under the law (3,000 pesos an acre, roughly 275 US dollars) before raising the offer to 21,000 pesos an acre (1,900 US dollars).

After the cancellation, 76% of Mexicans polled thought more unrest would follow the president during his term.

In May 2006, the PRD-led municipal government was attempting to relocate a group of flower vendors from a market of Texcoco. The group refused to leave and asked the assistance of the Community Front in Defense of the Land who confronted the police with machetes. The situation escalated and police officers were held hostage by the protestors. State and federal forces were sent to the site. According to municipal workers the protesters had felt invincible since the airport incident. The confrontation resulted in two deaths and dozens of injuries. On November 9 of the same year, the Attorney General's office admitted to torture and sexual abuse against the protesters.

Fox blamed the Atenco group, led by Ignacio Valle, for the incident and ordered his arrest calling the group an "insult to society".
In October 2006, two months before leaving office, Fox declared that the social conflicts of Atenco and Chiapas were solved and that Oaxaca would be solved before his successor took office.

Institutional image 

President Fox was the first President to have an institutional image that did not display the complete National Coat of Arms, causing controversy. The use of the slashed eagle (águila mocha, in Spanish), as it was called by critics (the word "mocha" having a negative connotation, mocho meaning both chopped and prudish Catholic), was extended to all the dependencies of the Executive Branch substituting the Seal of the United Mexican States (located at the bottom right corner of the Institutional logo) by the acronym of the dependencies. Successor President Felipe Calderón returned to using the complete coat of arms. Apart from criticism to showing only part of the Nation's Coat of Arms, some criticized the inclusion of the color blue to the Administration's institutional image (used in one-color depictions of the logo), as said color is associated to Fox's PAN party, and to a presumptive "F"-like band in the bottom of the image, which, critics suggested, gave more emphasis to Fox's personal image than to the Institution of the President.

2006 presidential election 

Fox openly supported Santiago Creel to become the PAN candidate in 2006. When Felipe Calderón was chosen, Fox endorsed him. On Chapter 14 of Luis Mandoki's Who is Mr. López? documentary titled "Foxilandia" Alfonso Durazo, Fox's former personal secretary, declared that no previous President was ever as active campaigning as Fox. After Calderón's win, López Obrador contested the elections. The Electoral Tribunal of the Judicial Power of the Federation declared the election to be clean but highlighted Fox's influence, declaring that it was the greatest irregularity in the election. Alfonsina Bertha Navarro, minister of the Electoral Tribunal, declared:

In August 2006, El Universal polled 600 people in Mexico City, where López Obrador served as Head of Government from 2000 to 2005. 59% believed that the 2006 elections were fraudulent and 63% believed votes should have been recounted. In February 2007, Fox declared about the desafuero process of López Obrador:

Approval ratings

When Fox took office on 1 December 2000, his approval rating neared 80%, being the first president in 71 years who wasn't a member of the PRI. During the rest of his presidency, his average approval rating was of 53%, while his average disapproval rating was of 40%.

As seen in the graphic, after taking office the particularly high points of his approval ratings were: 
 August 2002 (58% approval, 39% disapproval, 3% unsure), after Fox accepted to suspend the construction of a new airport in the State of Mexico, which had led to months of protests by local residents who resisted their displacement.
 May 2003 (57% approval, 37% disapproval, 6% unsure), after Fox announced that Mexico would not support the US invasion of Iraq.
Through out 2006, his approval rating in average was 58% and his average disapproval rating was of 37%, as Fox was on his last year as president and the public focus was on the Presidential elections of that year. The popularity enjoyed by Fox during this period, however, didn't seem to largely benefit the Presidential candidate of his party (PAN) Felipe Calderón, who was controversially declared winner with only 35.9% of the votes, against Andrés Manuel López Obrador of the PRD who officially obtained 35.3% of the votes and claimed that the election had been fraudulent.

While the lowest points of his approval ratings were:
March 2002 (39% approval, 52% disapproval, 9% unsure), in the wake of the "Comes y te vas" ("Eat and then leave") scandal: during the United Nations International Conference on Financing for Development, which took place between 18 and 22 March 2002 in the city of Monterrey and was hosted by Fox, a diplomatic incident occurred when on the night of the 19th Fox received a letter from Cuban leader Fidel Castro informing him that Castro intended to attend the event on the 21st, as he had been invited by the United Nations. Hours after receiving the letter, Fox made a telephone call to Castro in which he expressed his surprise at Castro's intention to attend the conference and scolded him for not telling him earlier. During the call, Fox suggested to Castro that he and the Cuban delegation arrive on the 21st as scheduled to make their presentation, and finally attend a lunch with the other leaders, after which they would return to Cuba. Fox was apparently worried that US President George W. Bush, who was also scheduled to arrive on the 21st, would be offended by Castro's presence at the conference, which is why Fox suggested Castro to leave after the lunch. Castro was outraged at the proposal, and told Fox that in response, he would make the contents of the call -which he was secretly taping- public, which he indeed did. The media quickly caught onto the incident, dubbing it "Comes y te vas" ("Eat and then leave") after Fox's suggestion towards Castro to leave the conference after the aforementioned lunch. The scandal badly hurt the Fox administration, as it made him seem subservient to the United States and it also broke with the Mexican diplomatic tradition of neutrality towards Cuba.
February 2004 (42% approval, 48% disapproval, 10% unsure), in the midst of scandals surrounding the First Lady Marta Sahagún, who was accused by an article in the Financial Times of using public funds to run her "Vamos México" foundation. In the same month, Sahagún announced that she intended to become the PAN candidate for the 2006 Presidential elections, an announcement that was deeply unpopular within the party.
Throughout the rest of 2004 and 2005, Fox's approval rating on average was 45% and his average disapproval rate was of 49%. His generalized descent in popularity during this period is attributed to the highly controversial process of Desafuero against Andrés Manuel López Obrador beginning in May 2004, when the Attorney General of the Republic, supported by the Federal Government, accused López Obrador, then Mayor of Mexico City, of disobeying a federal judge's order regarding an expropriation case, and requested both the removal (desafuero) of López Obrador's constitutional legal immunity and his destitution as Mayor of Mexico City. Due to López Obrador's very high approval ratings in Mexico City and the fact that Fox himself had harshly criticized his administration on previous occasions, López Obrador's supporters protested the desafuero process and accused Fox of trying to prevent López Obrador to participate in the 2006 Presidential elections (given that if he was officially charged, López Obrador would have lost all of his civil rights, including the right to run for the Presidency in 2006, unless he was either quickly acquitted of all charges or managed to serve his sentence before the electoral registration deadline). The process went on for 12 months, and was nearly unanimously criticized by national and foreign media, climaxing in April 2005. On 7 April, the Chamber of Deputies voted by 360 to 127 (with two abstentions) to lift López Obrador's constitutional immunity; nonetheless, after a massive rally in support of López Obrador took place in Mexico City on 24 April 2005, with an attendance exceeding one million people (at the time, the biggest political manifestation in recent Mexican history) Fox decided to stop the judicial process against López Obrador. 
May 2005 registered the lowest approval rating for Fox (35% approval, 59% disapproval, 6% unsure) in the aftermath of both the chaotic Desafuero process and the controversial comments made by Fox regarding African Americans that same month.

See also 
 Vicente Fox
 List of presidents of Mexico
 National Action Party (Mexico)
 2000 Mexican general election
 2006 Mexican general election
 Foxilandia

References 

Administration
Politics of Mexico
2000s in Mexico